Gérard Latortue (19 June 1934 – 27 February 2023) was a Haitian politician and diplomat who served as the prime minister of Haiti from 12 March 2004 to 9 June 2006. He was an official in the United Nations for many years, and briefly served as foreign minister of Haiti during the short-lived 1988 administration of Leslie Manigat.

Career 
In February 2004, the country experienced a coup d'état which saw the removal and exile of President Jean-Bertrand Aristide; Breaking with the Haitian constitution a "council of the wise" was set up by the international powers to choose a new Prime Minister. Latortue was selected by the Council and appointed head of the interim government on 9 March while still living in the United States, and was sworn in on 12 March.

His administration was recognized by the United Nations, the United States, Canada, and the European Union. He was denied recognition by the governments of Jamaica, Saint Kitts and Nevis, Venezuela, and Cuba, as well as the African Union. His government was beset with opposition from the Fanmi Lavalas political party (and with them, a large amount of the Haitian populace); an ongoing flight of foreign capital and human resources (especially by the country's economic elite, which, through the Group of 184, had supported the coup against Aristide and had contributed a significant number of personnel to the subsequent government); and violence by and between gangs, rebels, and militants (especially in Port-au-Prince and its metropolitan area), many of whom are either former members of the Haitian Armed Forces (disbanded by Aristide) or street gang supporters of the Aristide government "Chimere".

The 2006 elections in Haiti, to replace the interim government of Latortue established after the 2004 Haitian coup d'état, were delayed four times after having been originally scheduled for October and November 2005. The elections finally took place on 7 February 2006. The 129 member Haitian Parliament was also elected at this election. Run-off elections for the Chamber of Deputies of Haiti were held on 21 April 2006. In June 2006, Latortue was succeeded by Jacques-Édouard Alexis.

Latortue was the head of the observer mission of La Francophonie in Togo for that country's October 2007 parliamentary election.

Personal life and death
Latortue had three children. His daughter, Alexia, currently serves in the United States Department of the Treasury.

Latortue died after a fall on 27 February 2023, at the age of 88.

References

1934 births
2023 deaths
Prime Ministers of Haiti
Haitian diplomats
Foreign Ministers of Haiti
21st-century Haitian politicians
People from Gonaïves